Hymer AG is a motorhome and caravan manufacturer, located in Bad Waldsee, Germany. One of the largest manufacturers of motorhomes and caravans in Europe, the listed company Hymer AG owns several brands, including; Burstner, Carado, Sunlight, Etrusco, Elddis, Hymer, Laika, LMC, Niesmann + Bischoff, Dethleffs, Eriba, as well as camping equipment wholesale Movera. In February 2017 it acquired The Explorer Group based in Consett, UK adding the Elddis, Buccaneer, Compass and Xplore brands to its portfolio. In 2018, Thor Industries acquired Hymer.

History

Alfons Hymer, the father of Erwin Hymer, had operated a repair shop in Bad Waldsee since 1923. In 1956, Erich Bachem made the first caravan to a customer order, and in 1957 designer Erwin Hymer created the prototype "Eriba" range, the original Trolls.

As a result, that same year the two formed the new distribution company Hymer AG, and in 1958 the company began production of the Eriba-Troll range, which is still in production today. The first Hymer motorhome was produced in 1961, the Caravano.

During the mid-1960s, Dornier Flugzeugwerke and Hymer developed the Dornier Delta II, a development of the earlier Zündapp Janus. The vehicle could carry up to six passengers and offered two sleeping places for camping, but was never developed beyond the prototype stage. However, from 1971, serial production of motorcaravans started under the Hymer brand.

In 1980, the Hymer and Eriba companies formally merged, before also merging with Dethleffs and TEC to form CMC. Since 1990, the company became publicly traded. In 1995, the company became the first caravan manufacturer to become ISO 9001 certified.

In 1996, Hymer took over Niesmann + Bischoff GmbH, and in 1998 added Burstner. In the same year the camping accessories wholesaler Movera was founded. In 2000, Hymer AG acquired the Italian motorhome manufacturer Laika. The 100,000th leisure vehicle left the factory in October 2004. In 2005/6 Hymer and Dethleffs established of Capron Ltd., which distributes vehicles under the Carado and Sunlight brands.

On 29 October 2011, the €17 million Erwin Hymer Museum opened in Bad Waldsee.

In 2016, Hymer acquired esteemed North American Class B RV manufacturer Roadtrek, and created the subsidiary Erwin Hymer NA (North America) to manage the acquisition.

In 2018, Thor Industries acquired Erwin Hymer (Europe) without Erwin Hymer NA and Roadtrek because of financial irregularities uncovered at Erwin Hymer NA (during due diligence investigations as required by the sale). Erwin Hymer NA subsequently fired the CEO, and COO, halted work at four factories in Ontario, laid off approximately 850 workers, and went into Canadian receivership.

The Explorer Group
The Explorer Group, a subsidiary of Hymer, is the United Kingdom's second largest manufacturer of caravans, based in Consett. The Explorer Group produces Elddis, Buccaneer, Compass and Xplore brands.

Current
In financial year 2010/2011, Hymer Group turned over €792 million, with a workforce of 2,600 creating 14,243 motorhomes and 6,317 caravans. The Hymer Group operates from factories in:

Brands

Hymer AG 
Bürstner (caravans, motorhomes, campervans)
Crosscamp (campervans)
Dethleffs (caravans, motorhomes)
Eriba (caravans)
Etrusco (motorhomes, campervans)
Hymer (motorhomes, campervans)
Laika (motorhomes, campervans)
LMC (Lord Münsterland Caravan) (caravans, motorhomes)
Niesmann + Bischoff (motorhomes)
Movera (accessories)

Capron GmbH 
Carado (motorhomes, campervans)
Sunlight (motorhomes, campervans)

The Explorer Group 
Buccaneer (caravans)
Compass(caravans, motorhomes, campervans)
Elddis (caravans, motorhomes, campervans)
Xplore (caravans)

Locations 
Germany: Bad Waldsee, Kehl, Isny im Allgäu, Leutkirch im Allgäu, Sassenberg, Polch, Neustadt in Sachsen
France: Wissembourg
Italy: Tavarnelle Val di Pesa
UK: Consett
Canada: Kitchener, Ontario

References
 Monika Schramm: Auf Traumstraßen zu Sehnsuchtsorten, in: Frankfurter Allgemeine Sonntagszeitung, 6. November 2011, Seite V 8

External links

Hymer (English)
Bürstner Germany
Erwin-Hymer-Museum
Erwin Hymer Group North America
Explorer Group website

Motor vehicle manufacturers of Germany
Recreational vehicle manufacturers
Companies based in Baden-Württemberg
Vehicle manufacturing companies established in 1957
1957 establishments in West Germany